Alhaji Dr. Kandeh Kolleh Yumkella (born July 5, 1959) is a Sierra Leonean agricultural economist, politician, and the former United Nations Under-Secretary-General and the Special Representative of the Secretary-General for Sustainable Energy for All. He was also the chief executive officer of the Sustainable Energy for All Initiative. Yumkella is a former Chairman of UN-Energy and a two-term former Director-General of the United Nations Industrial Development Organization (UNIDO).

Born in Kambia District of Northern Sierra Leone, Yumkella has a B.Sc. from Njala University; a M.Sc. from the Cornell University; and a Ph.D. in Agricultural economics from the University of Illinois.

In December 2005, Dr. Kandeh K. Yumkella was appointed Director-General of the United Nations Industrial Development Organization (UNIDO), having previously worked in various high-level policy positions in UNIDO. He was re-appointed for a second four-year term in office in December 2009.

Prior to working for UNIDO, Yumkella was the Minister for Trade and Industry  of Sierra Leone from 1994 to 1995. From 1987 to 1996, he held various academic positions at Michigan State University and the University of Illinois in the United States. In recognition of his leadership and his passion for energy and environment-related causes, Yumkella was appointed as Chair of UN-Energy in 2008 by the UN Secretary-General.

Yumkella is a prominent public speaker, who addresses global issues, including poverty reduction, climate change, the Millennium Development Goals, and green industry and renewable energy. Dr. Yumkella's opinion pieces have appeared in major international newspapers, including The New York Times, the International Herald Tribune, and The Guardian. He has also appeared on several international broadcast networks, including CNN's Amanpour programme, BBC, Sky News, Aljazeera and CNBC.

Yumkella is a devout Muslim and a member of the Susu ethnic group. He is married to Philomena Yumkella.

Early life and education
Kandeh Kolleh Yumkella was born on July 5, 1959, in the rural village of Kychom, Samu Chiefdom, Kambia District in the Northern Province of Sierra Leone. His father, the late paramount chief Alhaji Bai Shebora Yumkella II, was an ethnic Susu and a founding member of the Sierra Leone People's Party (SLPP). His mother Haja Binta Yumkella is an ethnic Fula from Tambakha Chiefdom, Bombali District in  Northern Province, Sierra Leone. Kandeh Yumkela's mother Haja Binta Yumkella is the daughter of paramount chief Kandeh Kolleh, the first paramount chief of Tambakha Chiefdom in Bombali District. Kandeh Yumkela was born to very religious Muslim parents in Kambia District, and a devout Muslim himself. Yumkella attended the Christ The King College (CKC) secondary school in Bo.

Career

In December 2005, Dr. Kandeh K. Yumkella was appointed Director-General of the United Nations Industrial Development Organization (UNIDO), having previously worked in various high-level policy positions in UNIDO. He was re-appointed for a second four-year term in office in December 2009.

Prior to working for UNIDO, Yumkella was the Minister for Trade and Industry of Sierra Leone from 1994 to 1995. From 1987 to 1996, he held various academic positions at Michigan State University and the University of Illinois.

In recognition of his leadership and his passion for energy and environment-related causes, Yumkella was appointed as Chair of UN-Energy in 2008 by the UN Secretary-General. UN-Energy brings together all the UN organizations dealing with energy issues. As its chairman, Yumkella brought a renewed and vital focus to global energy issues and he helped to coordinate the UN response to energy issues.

In September 2011, Yumkella was appointed by the UN Secretary-General as co-chair of the High-level Group on Sustainable Energy for All. This followed a decision by the UN General Assembly to designate 2012 as the International Year for Sustainable Energy for All. As Co-chair of this High-level Group, Yumkella helps to guide the initiative aimed at highlighting the need for universal access to energy, as well as increased energy efficiency and enhanced deployment of renewable sources of energy.

Yumkella was a Member of the Rio+20 Principals Group, which played a crucial role in the preparations for the 2012 United Nations Conference on Sustainable Development. Since 2008, he has also been an active member of the UN Development Group, which helps to set and coordinate the global development priorities of the United Nations. Under his leadership as Director-General, UNIDO has maintained a role as the largest provider of trade-related technical assistance to developing countries in the UN system.

In September 2012, Secretary-General Ban Ki-moon appointed Yumkella as Special Representative for the Sustainable Energy for All Initiative.

Education
 1992 - Ph.D. Agricultural Economics, University of Illinois 
 1986 - M.Sc. Agricultural Economics, Cornell University 
 1982 - B.Sc. General Agriculture, Njala University College, Sierra Leone
 1978-  Christ the King College, Bo, Sierra Leone

Career
 1994 to 1995 – Minister for Trade, Industry and State Enterprises of Sierra Leone. 
 1996 Special – Advisor to UNIDO Director-General, Mauricio de Maria y Campos
 1996 to 2000 – Director of the Africa and Least Developed Countries Regional Bureau, UNIDO
 2000 to 2003 – UNIDO Representative and Director of the Regional Industrial Development Centre, Nigeria
 2003 to 2005 – Senior Advisor to UNIDO Director-General, Carlos Alfredo Magariños
 2005 to 2013 – Director General of UNIDO

Minister for Trade, Industry and State Enterprises of Sierra Leone

As Minister for Trade, Industry and State Enterprises, he successfully promoted market reforms and signed Sierra Leone's accession to the African Regional Standards Organization(ARSO)and launched initiatives to promote private sector development, establishment of public-private sector partnership and dialogue mechanisms.

He organized consultative processes between the government and the private sector for discussing constraints and obstacles to private sector growth with support from UNIDO, International Trade Center(ITC), African Project Development Facility (APDF) and UNDP Regional Bureau For Africa (UNDP/RBA).

As co-chair of the Public Enterprise Reform and Divestiture Commission(the privatization commission), supervised an internal review of the privatization council), supervised an internal review of the privatization program and promoted local awareness-building and domestic private sector participation in the program.

He also served as a member of the ministerial-level structural adjustment monitoring committee which provided oversight on policy reforms dealing with rationalization of the civil service workforce, judicial reform, petroleum product pricing and monetization of the rice subsidy.

Tenure at UNIDO

Yumkella has worked in different high-level policy positions in UNIDO, including as Special Adviser to two previous Directors-General and as Representative and Director of the first UNIDO Regional Office in Nigeria. 
He is the first from Sub-Saharan Africa to have been appointed to the position.
In December 2005, Yumkella was appointed as Director-General of UNIDO, and in December 2009 he was reconfirmed for a second term in office.

Under his leadership, UNIDO was at the forefront in providing solutions to many of the challenges the global community faces today: poverty, jobs, wealth creation and climate change. at UNIDO he gained a reputation for being an effective organizer who implemented policies and projects with impressive drive and focus, thus producing results of great and resplendent caliber. Under his administration UNIDO experienced an unprecedented level of growth in its programmes and has maintained a role as the largest trade-related technical assistance to developing countries in the United Nations System. this assistance has enabled many developing countries to produce and export goods meeting international standards.

Dr Yumkella has extensive specialized executive and advisory experience in program formulation, management and implementation of funds mobilization in fields such as private sector development, public-private sector dialogue and partnerships, small and medium enterprises(SMEs), support systems, capacity-building in industry and business associations, trade capacity-building, agro-industry and rural development.

He also facilitated high-level policy dialogue, consensus-building. advocacy and diplomatic negotiations at conferences of 
Heads of State, including the African Union, the Conference of African Ministers of Industry (CAMI) and United Nations global conferences.

Dr  Yumkella is a strong believer that the most effective way to fight poverty is to strengthen the productive capacities of countries and peoples. he has advocated for pro-poor sustainable industrial and agribusiness development as a means of wealth and job creation and the economic empowerment of the poor. Dr Yumkella is a firm believer in the linkage between "energy poverty" and "income poverty" in developing countries, and promotes the use of renewable energy to improve the productive capacities and welfare of rural communities.

UN-Energy 

In June 2009, Yumkella was appointed by UN Secretary-General Ban Ki-moon to chair a new Advisory Group on Energy and Climate Change. The members of the Group, comprising international experts, industry leaders and United Nations system representatives, advise on energy issues critical to the new global climate change deal and beyond.

Yumkella is the Chairman of UN-Energy, a United Nations system coordination body dealing with energy-related issues.

He is also a member of the China Council of International Cooperation on Environment and Development (CCICED) which Kandeh Yumkella is a prominent public speaker, who addresses global issues, including poverty reduction, climate change, the Millennium Development Goals, as well those related to Africa and the developing world in general, green industry and renewable energy.

Dr. Yumkella's opinion pieces have appeared in major international newspapers, including The New York Times, the International Herald Tribune, and The Guardian.

He has also appeared on several international broadcast networks, including CNN's Amanpour programme, BBC, Sky News, Aljazeera and CNBC.

Awards and honours
Honorary Doctorate University of Ghana, Ghana
 Honorary Doctorate University of Madras, India
 2008 Champion of Youth Award, 4th World Youth Congress in Quebec City, Canada
 Madhuri and Jagdish N. Sheth International Alumni Award for Exceptional Achievement, University of Illinois Urbana-Champaign (UIUC)
 The Prix de la Fondation of the Crans Montana Forum
 Honorary Distinguished Visiting Professor, Shanghai Institute of Foreign Trade
 Lifetime Achievement Award, Green White & Blue Commission
 Nayudamma Award for outstanding contributions to the energy sector, 13 November 2014
Commander of the National Order of Côte d'Ivoire
2013 Energy Efficiency Visionary award for his steadfast commitment to the sustainable Sustainable Energy for All Initiative and his work to advance the next generation of energy efficiency through the pillars of investment, education and modernization.
2012 South-South and Triangular Cooperation Visionary Award (United Nations of South-South Cooperation)
2012 United Nations Association (UNA-USA) Global Leadership Award, for the leadership he has provided to strengthen the United Nations
Award of "Honorary Professor" by the Mongolian University of Science and Technology, Ulan Bator, Mongolia (April 2012)
Wissam Award for Science "for his service as a son of Africa" (March 30, 2011)
Doctor of Science (Honoris Causa), Ekiti State university, Ado Ekiti, Nigeria in recognition for his contribution to global development and poverty alleviation in the world. (March 2012)
Doctor of Science (Honoris Causa) from the Njala University, Njala, Sierra Leone (March 2011)
Doctor of Philosophy (Honoris Causa) from TERI University, New Delhi (October 2010)
Doctor of Literature (Honoris Causa) at the 150th Year Special Convocation and Valedictory Function, University of Madras (September 
2008)
"Prix De la Fondation" presented by Prince Albert of Monaco of the Crans Montana Forum for his global leadership and work in development (June 2006)

References

External links
 Yumkella's Bio on the UNIDO official website
 Kandeh K. Yumkella interviewed by BBC's Andrew Marr

1959 births
Susu people
Living people
Christ the King College
United Nations Industrial Development Organization people
Michigan State University faculty
University of Illinois faculty
University of Illinois alumni
Government ministers of Sierra Leone
Sierra Leonean diplomats
Sierra Leonean officials of the United Nations
Sierra Leonean Muslims
People from Kambia District
Njala University alumni